Chen Hong (born February 28, 1970) is a Chinese softball player who competed in the 1996 Summer Olympics.

In 1996 she won the silver medal as part of the Chinese team. She played all ten matches.

External links
Profile at databaseolympics.com (archived)

1970 births
Living people
Chinese softball players
Olympic softball players of China
Softball players at the 1996 Summer Olympics
Olympic silver medalists for China
Olympic medalists in softball
Asian Games medalists in softball
Softball players at the 1994 Asian Games
Softball players at the 1998 Asian Games
Medalists at the 1994 Asian Games
Medalists at the 1998 Asian Games
Asian Games gold medalists for China
Medalists at the 1996 Summer Olympics

fr:Chen Hong